The  (French) or  (Dutch) is a popular historic neighbourhood of downtown Brussels, Belgium, situated between the Palace of Justice to its south-east, the Chapel Church to its north and the Halle Gate to its south. Its inhabitants are called Marolliens.

Lying at the heart of Marolles are the Place du Jeu de Balle/Vossenplein, home to the Old Market, and the Cité Hellemans collective housing complex. Major arteries of the district include the /, the / and the /. This area is served by Brussels-Chapel railway station and Brussels-South railway station, as well as by the metro and premetro (underground tram) station Porte de Hal/Hallepoort on lines 2, 3, 4 and 6.

The traditional Brabantian dialect of Brussels (known as Brusselian, and also sometimes referred to as Marols or Marollien) was widely spoken in the Marolles until the 20th century. It still survives among a small minority of inhabitants called Brusseleers (or Brusseleirs), many of them quite bi- and multilingual in French and Dutch.

History

Early history
The area now occupied by the Marolles lay, during the Middle Ages, in the first circumvallation of the city of Brussels. The sisters' presence was short-lived, as they relocated to the / in the Quays District.

The first mention of a Walsche Plaetse (1328), literally "Walloon Place", probably indicates an early presence of French-speaking traders and craftsmen in the neighbourhood, as it was a logical arrival place for migrants from the south. In 1405, a fire broke out in the neighbourhood and destroyed some 2,400 homes.

In the 17th and 18th centuries, the nobility and the bourgeoisie of Brussels built mansions along the /. The Marolles became a working class district in the succeeding centuries.

19th century

In 1860, during the reign of King Leopold I, a royal decree announced the construction of a new Palace of Justice (the old one located on what is today the / having quickly deteriorated and exceeded its capacity), and an international architectural contest was organised for its design. After several failed proposals, the then-Minister of Justice Victor Tesch appointed the architect Joseph Poelaert to draw plans of the building in 1861. The first stone was laid on 31 October 1866, and the building was inaugurated on 15 October 1883, four years after Poelaert's death in 1879. The Palace's location is on the Galgenberg hill ("Gallows Mount"), where in the Middle Ages convicted criminals were hanged, hence its name.

For the Palace of Justice's construction, a section of the Marolles was demolished, while most of the park belonging to the House of Merode was also expropriated. The 75 landlords belonging to the nobility and the high bourgeoisie, many of whom lived in their homes, received large indemnities, while the other more modest inhabitants, about a hundred, were also forced to move by the Belgian Government, though they were compensated with houses in the Tillens-Roosendael garden city in the Quartier du Chat in the Uccle municipality.

Poelaert himself resided in the Marolles, only a few hundred metres from the building, on the /, in a house adjoining his vast offices and workshops and communicating with them. It is thus unlikely he saw himself as ruining the neighbourhood. Nonetheless, many angry citizens personally blamed Poelaert for the forced relocations, and the expression schieven architect (meaning "shameful architect") became one of the most serious insults in the dialect of the Marolles.

20th and 21st centuries

Many Jews resided in the neighbourhood before the first Nazi arrests and deportations in the summer of 1942. Many of them had arrived there after fleeing the pogroms that accompanied the 1905 Russian Revolution, with others following between 1933 and 1938, after Hitler's accession to power in Germany. At that time, their population was estimated at about 3,000 people. A first synagogue had been built on the /, where a commemorative plaque now recalls the deportations.

In some areas of the Marolles, the ensuing poverty left its mark on the urban landscape and scarred the social life of the community, leading to rising crime rates and pervading cultural intolerance. In 2006, riots began in this area. However, from the / to the Place du Jeu de Balle/Vossenplein, where a daily flea market known as the Old Market has been held since 1873, along the Rue Haute and the /, second-hand and popular shops have for some years given way to antique shops, marking a profound change to the neighbourhood.

Sights
 The Church of Our Lady of the Chapel or Chapel Church, a Gothic Roman Catholic church dating from the 12th–13th centuries.
 The Halle Gate, the only survivor of the series of gates which allowed passage inside the second walls of Brussels.
 The /, one of the longest and oldest streets in the city, follows the course of an old Gallo-Roman road, and runs along Saint Peter's Hospital, which was itself built in 1935 on the site of a lepers' hospital.
 The Palace of Justice, the most important court building in Belgium, also reputed to be the largest building constructed in the 19th century.
 The Cité Hellemans, a remarkable example of early 20th-century collective housing complexes, was built on the site of the neighbourhood's many squalid cul-de-sacs.

See also
 History of Brussels
 Belgium in "the long nineteenth century"

References

Notes

Bibliography

External links

 Daily flea market (Voddenmarkt/Marché aux puces) at the Place du Jeu de Balle in the heart of the quarter
 Lewis, Barbara. "From lepers to art lovers, an ever-changing Brussels district." Reuters. Friday August 28, 2015.

Neighbourhoods of Brussels
City of Brussels